Siphokuhle Patrein (born 9 October 1990) is a South African politician and a member of the National Assembly of South Africa from the Western Cape. Patrein is a member of the African National Congress.

Political career
Patrein was elected as the deputy provincial secretary of the African National Congress Youth League in 2018.

In 2019 Patrein stood for election to the South African National Assembly as 7th on the ANC's Western Cape regional list. At the election, she won a seat in parliament. After the election, Patrein was elected to serve on the Portfolio Committee on Police.

References

External links

Ms Siphokuhle Patrein at Parliament of South Africa

Living people
Xhosa people
1990 births
People from the Western Cape
African National Congress politicians
Members of the National Assembly of South Africa
Women members of the National Assembly of South Africa